Snooker world rankings 1989/1990: The professional world rankings for the top 32 snooker players and two others from the top 64 in the 1989–90 season are listed below.

References

1989
Rankings 1990
Rankings 1989